A Nation Like No Other: Why American Exceptionalism Matters is a political nonfiction book by American politician and author Newt Gingrich. It deals with American exceptionalism, and how the modern-day conservative take on the theorem relates to that of the Founding Fathers.

References

2011 non-fiction books
Books by Newt Gingrich
Regnery Publishing books